Samuel Pack Elliott (born August 9, 1944) is an American actor. He is the recipient of several accolades, including a Screen Actors Guild Award, and a National Board of Review Award, and has been nominated for an Academy Award, two Golden Globe Awards, and two Emmy Awards.

Elliott is known for his distinctive lanky physique, full mustache, and a deep, sonorous voice. He began his film career with minor appearances in The Way West (1967),  Butch Cassidy and the Sundance Kid (1969), season five of Mission: Impossible and guest-starred on television in the Western Gunsmoke (1972) and the television films Murder in Texas (1981) and The Shadow Riders (1982). He starred in Frogs (1972). His film breakthrough was in the drama Lifeguard (1976). He then appeared in several Louis L'Amour adaptations such as The Quick and the Dead (1987) and Conagher (1991), the latter of which earned him a Golden Globe nomination for Best Actor – Miniseries or Television Film. He received his second Golden Globe and first Primetime Emmy Award nominations for Buffalo Girls (1995). Other film credits from the early 1990s include as John Buford in the historical drama Gettysburg (1993) and as Virgil Earp in the Western Tombstone (also 1993). In 1998 he played the Stranger in The Big Lebowski.

In the 2000s, Elliott appeared in supporting roles in the drama We Were Soldiers (2002), and the superhero films Hulk (2003), and Ghost Rider (2007). In 2015, he guest-starred on the series Justified, which earned him a Critics' Choice Television Award, and in 2016 began starring in the Netflix series The Ranch. He subsequently had a lead role in the comedy-drama The Hero (2017). The following year, Elliott was cast in the musical drama A Star Is Born (2018), for which he was nominated for the Academy Award for Best Supporting Actor, Critics' Choice Award for Best Supporting Actor, Screen Actors Guild Award for Outstanding Performance by a Male Actor in a Supporting Role, and won a National Board of Review Award. Elliott starred as Shea Brennan in the American drama miniseries 1883 (2021–2022), for which he won the Screen Actors Guild Award for Outstanding Performance by a Male Actor in a Miniseries or Television Movie.

Early life

Samuel Pack Elliott was born August 9, 1944, at the Sutter Memorial Hospital in Sacramento, California, the son of Glynn Mamie (née Sparks), a physical training instructor and high school teacher, and Henry Nelson Elliott (1911–1966), who worked as a predator control specialist for the Department of the Interior. His parents were originally from El Paso, Texas, and Elliott has an ancestor who served as a surgeon at the Battle of San Jacinto. He moved from California to Portland, Oregon, with his family when he was 13 years old.

Elliott spent his teenage years living in northeast Portland, and graduated from David Douglas High School in 1962. After graduating from high school, Elliott attended college at the University of Oregon as an English and psychology major for two terms before dropping out. He returned to Portland and attended Clark College in nearby Vancouver, Washington, where he completed a two-year program and was cast as Big Jule in a stage production of Guys and Dolls. The Vancouver Columbian newspaper suggested that Elliott should be a professional actor. After his graduation from Clark in 1965, Elliott re-enrolled at the University of Oregon and pledged at the Sigma Alpha Epsilon fraternity. He dropped out again after his father died  of a heart attack.

In the late 1960s, Elliott relocated to Los Angeles to pursue a career in acting, which his father had dissuaded him from doing, instead urging him to obtain a college degree. "He gave me that proverbial line, 'You've got a snowball's chance in hell of having a career in (Hollywood),'" Elliott recalled. "He was a realist, my dad. He was a hard worker. He had a work ethic that I've fashioned mine after, and I thank him for that every day." Elliott worked in construction while studying acting and served in the California Air National Guard's 146th Airlift Wing (the Hollywood Guard) at Van Nuys Airport before the unit moved to Channel Islands Air National Guard Station.

Career

Early work

Elliott began his career as a character actor; his appearance, voice, and bearing were well-suited to Westerns. In 1969, he earned his first television credit as Dan Kenyon in Judd for the Defense in the episode "The Crystal Maze".

That same year he appeared in the show Lancer in the episode "Death Bait", playing Renslo. He went on to appear in two additional episodes of the series between 1970 and 1971. One of his early film roles was as a card player who watches as the Sundance Kid (Robert Redford) demonstrates his shooting ability in the opening scene of Butch Cassidy and the Sundance Kid (1969). In the 1970–1971 television season, Elliott starred as Doug Robert for several episodes in the hit series Mission: Impossible. Beginning in 1972, Elliott appeared as the cowboy Walker in a series of Falstaff Beer commercials. In 1975, Elliott was cast in a lead role as Charles Wood in the television film I Will Fight No More Forever, a dramatization of Chief Joseph's resistance to the U.S. government's forcible removal of his Nez Perce Indian tribe to a reservation in Idaho.

From 1976 to 1977, he played the lead character Sam Damon in the miniseries Once an Eagle, an adaptation of the Anton Myrer novel of the same name, opposite Amy Irving, Kim Hunter, Clu Gulager, and Melanie Griffith. He also had a starring role as Rick Carlson in the summer sleeper hit Lifeguard (1976), which marked his feature film breakthrough. He portrayed a lifeguard in Southern California who reevaluates his life choices after being invited to a reunion. Variety deemed the film "unsatisfying," adding: "Elliott, who has some beefcake value, projects a character who is mostly a passive reactor rather than a person in sure command of his fate."

Recognition as a character actor

Elliott played Tom Keating in the miniseries Aspen in 1977. He later played an abusive wife-killer in the miniseries Murder in Texas (1981) opposite Farrah Fawcett and his future wife Katharine Ross, and starred with Cheryl Ladd in A Death in California (1985). In 1979, he co-starred with Tom Selleck in the popular miniseries adaptation of Louis L'Amour's The Sacketts. Elliott and Selleck were a team again in 1982 in The Shadow Riders, another Louis L'Amour adaption.

Elliott had a supporting role in Mask (1985) opposite Cher and he played a hard-nosed, rough-around-the-edges but ultimately sympathetic father figure in the Christmas film Prancer (1989). He has made guest appearances on shows including Felony Squad, Gunsmoke, Lancer, and Hawaii Five-O, and has been featured in many TV movies, including Buffalo Girls (1995), in which he played Wild Bill Hickok.

In 1986, he starred in TV movie Gone to Texas, based on a biography of Sam Houston. The role allowed him to play Houston as both fighter and a man who grew into a skillful political leader; the film depicted his disgrace as governor of Tennessee, his return to his Cherokee Nation friends, and his pivotal role in the liberation of Texas from Mexico in 1836. Elliott played Wade Garrett in Road House (1989). In 1991, Elliott and his wife Katharine Ross starred in the adaptation of the Louis L'Amour novel Conagher (1991).

He portrayed Brigadier General John Buford in the 1993 historical drama Gettysburg, and the same year played Virgil Earp in the Western Tombstone (1993).  Elliott played The Stranger, a character narrating the story of The Big Lebowski (1998). He co-starred in We Were Soldiers (2002), an adaptation of We Were Soldiers Once… And Young, in which he portrayed Command Sergeant Major Basil L. Plumley. He played General Thaddeus Ross in the 2003 action film Hulk.

Later career
In 2005, he appeared in Thank You for Smoking as a former Marlboro Man advertisement cowboy who has developed lung cancer. In 2006 he provided the voice for the character Ben the Cow in the animated film Barnyard.

In 2007, Elliott joined the comic book adaptation Ghost Rider. He played the character Carter Slade. The same year, Elliott appeared in The Golden Compass as the character Lee Scoresby. The film is based on Northern Lights in Philip Pullman's trilogy His Dark Materials. Also appearing in the film are Nicole Kidman, Christopher Lee, and Daniel Craig.

In 2009, Elliott had a small role in Up In The Air in which he portrayed the chief pilot of American Airlines. He appeared three times on Parks and Recreation as Ron Dunn, the Eagleton equivalent of Ron Swanson; Dunn is a hippie, compared to Swanson's staunch survivalist and Libertarian personality. He then provided the voice of Buster (a.k.a. Chupadogra) in the animated film Marmaduke (2010). He had a supporting role in the thriller film The Company You Keep and played a college football coach in 2014's drama film Draft Day.

In 2015, Elliott appeared opposite Lily Tomlin as a former love interest of a grandmother (Tomlin) attempting to help her pregnant granddaughter in Paul Weitz's comedy Grandma. In the same year he appeared in the romance I'll See You in My Dreams, and had a role in the independent film Digging for Fire. In 2015, he won the Critics' Choice Television Award for best guest performer in a drama for his role in the FX Network's show Justified.

Career resurgence and critical acclaim
In 2015, Elliott began appearing as a series regular in the Netflix series The Ranch, opposite Ashton Kutcher and Danny Masterson. He also had a recurring role as Phil Millstein in the second season of Grace and Frankie. In film, he supplied the voice of Butch in the animated film The Good Dinosaur (2015).

In 2017, Elliott starred in The Hero, as Lee Hayden, an aging Western icon with a golden voice, whose best performances are decades behind him. His work in the film received much critical acclaim with Joey Magidson, writing for AwardsCircuit, proclaiming that "Elliott is perfect here. The Hero encapsulates everything you love about him into one package." Later that year, Elliott starred in The Man Who Killed Hitler and Then the Bigfoot.

The following year, Elliott costarred in A Star Is Born (2018), in which he plays Bobby Maine, the elder half-brother of Bradley Cooper's lead character. Elliott received critical acclaim for his performance, winning the National Board of Review Award for Best Supporting Actor. He was also nominated for the Screen Actors Guild Award for Outstanding Performance by a Male Actor in a Supporting Role, as well as the Academy Award for Best Supporting Actor,  his career-first nomination. Commenting on his Academy Award nomination, Elliott declared "I think the thing off the top of my head might be, 'It's about fucking time!'"

In 2022, Elliot played Shea Brennan on the Paramount+ miniseries 1883, a prequel to the Yellowstone series. The show's story involves Brennan as he leads a group of immigrants from Fort Worth, Texas into the untamed western areas of the plains, and its connection to the Dutton family and its migration to Montana. The show aired its first season from late 2021 until February 2022. For his performance he won the Screen Actors Guild Award for Outstanding Performance by a Male Actor in a Miniseries or Television Movie.

Other ventures
In 1998, Elliott was named the grand marshal of the Calgary Stampede parade and rode in the procession before an estimated 300,000 spectators.

Voice work
Elliott has performed voice-over narration for various commercials. He has lent his voice to campaigns for Dodge, IBM, Kinney Drugs, Union Pacific, and most notably the American Beef Council, succeeding Robert Mitchum in the latter. Since late 2007 Elliott has done voice-overs for Coors beer, bringing his deep, rich voice and "western" appeal to the brand brewed in Colorado. In 2010, Ram Trucks hired Elliott to do the voice-over for their Ram Heavy Duty truck commercial; he has been voicing their commercials since. Starting in 2008, he has voiced Smokey Bear, and shares the mascot's birth date (August 9, 1944). He also narrated the Pittsburgh Steelers and Green Bay Packers team introductions to Super Bowl XLV, played at Cowboys Stadium in Arlington, Texas at the conclusion of the 2010 NFL season for NFL on Fox. On September 9, 2020, it was announced that Elliott would begin recurring on Family Guy as the new mayor of Quahog, the late Mayor Adam West's cousin, Wild Wild West. Also in 2020, he voiced Joe Biden's "Go From There" campaign ad.

Personal life
Elliott married actress Katharine Ross in 1984, becoming her fifth husband. They have a daughter, Cleo, who is a musician in Malibu, California. Ross and Elliott live on a seaside ranch in Malibu, which they purchased in the 1970s. Elliott also maintains a property in the Willamette Valley in Oregon. Following his mother's death in 2012 at the age of 96, he also took ownership of his childhood home in northeast Portland.

Filmography

Accolades

References

External links

 
 
 

1944 births
20th-century American male actors
21st-century American male actors
American male film actors
American male stage actors
American male television actors
American male voice actors
American people of English descent
American people of Scottish descent
United States Air Force airmen
David Douglas High School alumni
Living people
Male actors from Portland, Oregon
Male actors from Sacramento, California
Male Western (genre) film actors
University of Oregon alumni
Clark College alumni
Outstanding Performance by a Male Actor in a Miniseries or Television Movie Screen Actors Guild Award winners